Sir Philip Mainwaring (1589 – 2 August 1661) was an English politician who sat in the House of Commons variously between 1625 and 1661.

Mainwaring was the seventh son of Randall Mainwaring, of Peover, Cheshire and Margaret Fitton, daughter of Sir Edward Fitton (the elder) of Gawsworth Old Hall and Ann Warburton. He was admitted at Gray's Inn on 14 March 1609, and matriculated at Cambridge from Brasenose College, Oxford on 29 August 1610. He was awarded BA from Oxford in 1613 and entered Lincoln's Inn on 15 February 1614. In 1624 he was awarded MA at Cambridge on the visit of King Charles.

Mainwaring was elected Member of Parliament for Boroughbridge in 1625 and 1626. He was elected MP for Derby in 1628 and sat until 1629 when King Charles decided to rule without parliament for eleven years.

In 1634 Mainwaring became Principal Secretary to the Lord Deputy of Ireland, Lord Strafford. Strafford's biographer refers to him as a "court hanger-on" who was disliked by many of Strafford's friends, but who had provided him with useful intelligence in the past, and who justified the Earl's trust by proving a diligent and loyal official, who remained faithful to his employer to the end.

He was knighted at Dublin Castle on 13 July 1634. He was an MP in the Irish House of Commons  for Clonakilty from 1634 to 1635 and for Carysfort from 1640 to 1641.

Mainwaring was elected MP for Morpeth for the Short Parliament in April 1640. He was imprisoned as a staunch Royalist in 1650.

After the Restoration of Charles II he applied unsuccessfully for the position of headmaster of Charterhouse School. In December 1660, Mainwaring was appointed to the Irish Privy Council. It was suggested that given his advanced years he should step down from his old office as Principal Secretary, but he held on firmly to his place. He was then elected MP for Newton in the Cavalier Parliament in 1661, but died later that year. He never married.

References

 Charles Arnold-Baker, The Companion to British History, London 2001, p. 845 (online at google books)
 

1589 births
1661 deaths
Members of the Privy Council of Ireland
English MPs 1625
English MPs 1626
English MPs 1628–1629
Irish MPs 1634–1635
Irish MPs 1639–1649
English MPs 1640 (April)
English MPs 1661–1679
Members of the Parliament of Ireland (pre-1801) for County Cork constituencies
Members of the Parliament of Ireland (pre-1801) for County Wicklow constituencies